Glen Lyon is a glen in the Perth and Kinross region of Scotland.

This glen was also known as An Crom Ghleann ("The Bent Glen"). It forms part of the Loch Rannoch and Glen Lyon National Scenic Area, one of 40 such areas in Scotland, which are defined so as to identify areas of exceptional scenery and to ensure its protection from inappropriate development by restricting certain forms of development. Sir Walter Scott described Glen Lyon as the "longest, loneliest and loveliest glen in Scotland". Apart from a few scattered farms and cottages throughout the glen, the only real settlements are at Fortingall and Bridge of Balgie.

The Glen contains several small hamlets and has a Primary school where Gaelic is taught weekly.

History

Quite densely inhabited from prehistoric times (as many archaeological sites attest), though its present population is of modest size, the glen has been home to many families, including MacGregors, Lyons, Menzies, Stewarts, Macnaughtans, MacGibbons and the Campbells of Glen Lyon. At the end of the eleventh century the de Leons (later shortened to "Lyon") had come north with Edgar, son of Malcolm III of Scotland to fight against his uncle, Donald Bane. Edgar was victorious and the de Leons received lands that were later called Glen Lyon in Perthshire. Glen Lyon is a corruption from the Gaelic "lithe" meaning "flood", a frequent state of the River Lyon. Robert Campbell of Glenlyon (1630–1696), led the detachment of government troops responsible for the infamous Glencoe Massacre, of the MacDonalds of Glencoe in 1691.  A magnificent silver-gilt brooch set with precious stones belonging to the Campbells of Glen Lyon (that has been dated to the early 16th century) is currently in the collection of the British Museum.

Glen Lyon, also written Glenlyon, has been the home of (among others) early Christian monks (including Adomnán [locally Eonán] (died 704), Abbot of Iona and biographer of St Columba). It contains at least two castles: Meggernie Castle [still inhabited] and Carnbaan [ruined].  Its history is described in Alexander Stewart's A Highland Parish (1928), and Duncan Campbell's The Lairds of Glenlyon (1886).

Book of Lismore
James MacGregor, parish priest of Fortingall in the early 16th century, compiled the Book of the Dean of Lismore, the most important surviving collection of medieval Scottish Gaelic poetry. His Chronicle, covering local events in a mixture of Scots and Latin, is also extant, and is an important historical source for the central Highlands.

Gallery

References

Glens of Scotland
Protected areas of Perth and Kinross
National scenic areas of Scotland
Valleys of Perth and Kinross